is a Japanese footballer who plays for Cerezo Osaka as an attacking midfielder.

Career
Okuno started his career at Vegalta Sendai, signing professional forms in 2012 after graduating through the youth set-up. He made his J. League debut against Kawasaki Frontale at Todoroki Stadium.

Club statistics
Updated to 18 July 2022.

1Includes Promotion Playoffs to J1.

References

External links
Profile at Vegalta Sendai

1989 births
Living people
Sendai University alumni
Association football people from Osaka Prefecture
Japanese footballers
J1 League players
J2 League players
Sendai University Meisei High School alumni
Vegalta Sendai players
V-Varen Nagasaki players
Cerezo Osaka players
Association football midfielders